William Posey Edwards (November 9, 1835 – June 28, 1900) was a U.S. Representative from Georgia.

Born near Talbotton, Georgia, Edwards attended the common schools, and was graduated from Collinsworth Institute, Talbotton, Georgia, in 1856.
He studied law.
He was admitted to the bar in 1857 and commenced practice in Butler, Georgia.
He served as member of the State constitutional convention in 1857 and 1858.
He served during the Civil War in the Confederate States Army as captain of Company F, Twenty-seventh Georgia Volunteer Infantry.
He was subsequently promoted to colonel of the regiment.
Upon the readmission of Georgia to representation was elected as a Republican to the Fortieth Congress and served from July 25, 1868, to March 3, 1869.
Presented credentials as a Member-elect to the Forty-first Congress, but was not permitted to qualify.
He resumed the practice of his profession at Butler, Georgia, and died there June 28, 1900.
He was interred in the Methodist Cemetery.

References

1835 births
1900 deaths
People from Talbot County, Georgia
Republican Party members of the United States House of Representatives from Georgia (U.S. state)
People from Butler, Georgia
19th-century American politicians
Confederate States Army officers
Military personnel from Georgia (U.S. state)
People of Georgia (U.S. state) in the American Civil War